Auguste-René-Marie Dubourg (30 September 1842—22 September 1921) was a French Cardinal of the Roman Catholic Church. He served as Archbishop of Rennes from 1906 until his death, and was elevated to the cardinalate in 1916.

Biography
Auguste Dubourg was born in Loguivy-Plougras, and studied at the seminary in Saint-Brieuc before being ordained to the priesthood on 22 December 1866. He then taught at the Minor Seminary of Saint-Brieuc, and served as secretary of the episcopal curia, vicar general, and vicar capitular of Saint-Brieuc.

On 19 January 1893, Dubourg was appointed Bishop of Moulins by Pope Leo XIII. He received his episcopal consecration on the following 16 April from Bishop Pierre-Marie-Frédéric Fallières, with Bishops François-Marie Trégaro and Etienne-Marie Potron, OFM, serving as co-consecrators, in Saint-Brieuc Cathedral.

Dubourg was later promoted to Archbishop of Rennes on 6 August 1906. Pope Benedict XV created him Cardinal Priest of S. Balbina in the consistory of 4 December 1916.

The Cardinal died in Rennes, at age 79. He is buried in the metropolitan cathedral of Rennes.

References

1842 births
1921 deaths
20th-century French cardinals
Bishops of Moulins
Archbishops of Rennes
19th-century French Roman Catholic bishops